The South Central Corridor is one of ten federally designated high-speed rail corridors in the United States. The proposed corridor consists of two segments:
 Tulsa, Oklahoma, to Fort Worth, Texas (322 miles)
 Little Rock, Arkansas, via Dallas/Fort Worth to San Antonio, Texas (672 miles)

See also 
 High-speed rail in the United States
 Texas Central Railway – a proposed high-speed railway between Dallas and Houston

External links 
 South Central Corridor  (archived link) | Federal Railroad Administration

High-speed railway lines in the United States